Trek Aerospace Inc is a small engineering company based in Folsom, California, United States.  Despite its name, Trek Aerospace currently manufactures only terrestrial ducted-fan-powered aircraft and watercraft.  The company's products have received some media attention,

particularly its ducted-fan based "jetpacks", an exoskeleton mounted with dual ducted-fan propulsion, such as the Springtail model.

See also
 SoloTrek XFV
 Trek Aerospace Dragonfly
 Trek Aerospace Springtail

References

External links
 Trek Aerospace website

Aerospace companies of the United States